Open Your Mouth for the Speechless... in Case of Those Appointed to Die is the debut album by American metal band A Life Once Lost. The 2004 reissue of this album, originally released in 2000 in a limited edition, features an improved remix and remastering, all-new artwork, and a trio of bonus tracks, two early demos of songs from this album's follow-up and a more recent live recording. This album is noticeably heavier than ALOL's newer recordings. There is a demo recording floating around P2P networks and the internet of the track "A Falls River Farewell". It includes backing vocals from Anthony Green and is 5:31 in length, as compared to the album version of "A Falls River Farewell".

Track listing

Personnel 
Richard Arnold – bass
Robert Carpenter – guitar
T.J. De Blois – drums
Justin Graves – drums
John Hiltz – engineering
Scott Hull – mastering
Robert Meadows – vocals
Vincent Ratti – engineer, mixing
Bill Sullivan – keyboards
Vadim Taver – guitar
Adam Wentworth – design, layout design

References 

2000 debut albums
A Life Once Lost albums
Robotic Empire albums